John of Lodi (1025–1106) was an Italian hermit and bishop.

John was born in Lodi Vecchio in 1025. In the 1060s he became a hermit at the Camaldolese monastery of Fonte Avellana. He became a disciple and the personal secretary of Peter Damian, who was the prior of Fonte Avellana. After Damian's death in 1072, John  wrote a biography of Damian (1076-1082). John later became prior of Fonte Avellana (1082-1084, and again 1100–1101). In 1104 he became Bishop of Gubbio, and held this office until his death.

Notes

External links
St. John of Lodi
San Giovanni da Lodi (in Italian)

1025 births
1106 deaths
People from the Province of Lodi
Italian Roman Catholic saints
12th-century Christian saints
Italian Benedictines
12th-century Italian Roman Catholic bishops